George Venables-Vernon, 1st Baron Vernon (9 February 1709 – 2 August 1780), was a British politician.

Vernon was the son of Henry Vernon, of Sudbury, Derbyshire, and his wife Anne, daughter and heiress of Thomas Pigott by his wife Mary, sister and heiress of Sir Peter Venables, Baron of Kinderton, Cheshire. His father died in 1719, leaving him Sudbury Hall, and in 1728 he assumed by royal licence the additional surname of Venables after he had succeeded Sir Peter Venables to Kinderton in 1715.

He sat as a Member of Parliament for Lichfield from 1731 to 1747 and for Derby from 1754 to 1762. In 1762 he was raised to the peerage as Lord Vernon, Baron of Kinderton, in the County of Chester.

He lived at Sudbury Hall, one the country's finest Restoration mansions, which now is a Grade I listed building.

Lord Vernon was married three times and several of his descendants gained distinction. He married firstly the Hon. Mary, daughter of Thomas Howard, 6th Baron Howard of Effingham, in 1733.  Together they had a son:

 George Venables-Vernon, 2nd Baron Vernon

After her death in 1740 he married secondly Ann, daughter of Sir Thomas Lee, in 1741.

After her death the following year he married thirdly Martha, daughter of Simon Harcourt, younger son of Simon Harcourt, 1st Viscount Harcourt, in 1744.  Together they had a son:

 Edward Venables-Vernon-Harcourt

Lord Vernon died in August 1780, aged 71, and was succeeded in the barony by his son from his first marriage, George. His second son from his third marriage, the Most Reverend the Hon. Edward Harcourt (who assumed the surname of Harcourt) became Archbishop of York and was the grandfather of Sir William Vernon Harcourt and the great-grandfather of Lewis Harcourt, 1st Viscount Harcourt.

The widowed Lady Vernon moved to Grosvenor Square. where she lived until her death in 1794.

References

Kidd, Charles, Williamson, David (editors). Debrett's Peerage and Baronetage (1990 edition). New York: St Martin's Press, 1990.

People from Sudbury, Derbyshire
1709 births
1780 deaths
Peers of Great Britain created by George III
Members of the Parliament of Great Britain for Derby
Members of the Parliament of Great Britain for Lichfield
British MPs 1727–1734
British MPs 1734–1741
British MPs 1741–1747
British MPs 1754–1761
British MPs 1761–1768
George 1